Capcom Beat 'Em Up Bundle (released in Japan as Capcom Belt Action Collection), is a compilation of Capcom arcade beat 'em ups developed and published by Capcom. The collection was released digitally for Nintendo Switch, PlayStation 4,  and Xbox One in September 2018, with the game being released for Windows later in October 2018. A physical release occurred in Japan on December 6 for PlayStation 4 and Nintendo Switch.

Gameplay
Capcom Beat 'Em Up Bundle is a compilation that collects the arcade versions of seven beat 'em ups from Capcom:
Final Fight (1989)
Captain Commando (1991)
The King of Dragons (1991)
Knights of the Round (1991)
Warriors of Fate (1992)
Armored Warriors (1994)
Battle Circuit (1997)

Each of the seven games includes the option to play the English or Japanese version of the game. In addition, all of the games support online multiplayer. This release marks the first home console releases for both Armored Warriors and Battle Circuit.

The collection includes a gallery to view concept art, final art, characters and art from the collection itself.

Notes

References

2018 video games
Capcom video game compilations
Nintendo Switch games
PlayStation 4 games
Capcom beat 'em ups
Video games developed in Japan
Windows games
Xbox One games
Multiplayer and single-player video games